Miss is an honorific title of unmarried woman, see also Mistress (form of address)

Miss or MISS may also refer to:

 Man In Space Soonest, a U.S. Airforce space program that eventually became Project Mercury
 MISS, four-letter code for the Mississippi National River and Recreation Area in the U.S. state of Minnesota
 Mississippi, a U.S. state
 Miss World, oldest surviving major international beauty pageant
 Miss Universe
 Miss Press, an imprint of the German group VDM Publishing devoted to the reproduction of Wikipedia content
 Microbially induced sedimentary structure, a sedimentary structure formed by the interaction of microbes with sediment

See also
 Cache MISS
 Missy